The Zawiya of Sidi Ahmed al-Tijani, or Zawiya Tijaniya Al Koubra, is a zawiya, an Islamic religious complex building for education and commemoration, in Fez, Morocco. The building is located inside Fes el Bali, the old medina quarter of the city. More specifically, it is situated in the Al-Blida neighborhood, close to the University of Al Quaraouiyine. It is dedicated to the founder of the Tijaniyyah tariqa from the 18th century, Sheikh Ahmad al-Tijani who is buried in the site. It is among the several other zawiyas dedicated to Al-Tijani. The complex is distinguishable from highly ornamented facades facing the street, and a minaret in turquoise color.

Description

The construction was initiated by Al-Tijani. He and his companions looked for the suitable place for building their institution in Fez and visited several mosques for considerations. Eventually, they picked the spot in the Al-Blida neighborhood, back then known as Al-Dardas. There was already a zawiya built in the place by a man known as Sidi al-Lahbi. Al-Tijani purchased the land by his own money which was considered halal. He also received the financial support by the emir Moulay Slimane. After Al-Tijani's death he was buried in the site. The zawiya was not allowed for stranger to visit as they required trust of members of the community. It also explicitly prohibits the burial of any other persons. The companions had bought a marble and inscribed the quote by Al-Tijani on it, which reportedly said anybody who’s buried in the site will go to hell. The marble is located in the center arena in front of the old entrance.

The building was renovated several times, with varying levels of additions to its feature. In 1881, a new mihrab was added. In 1895, a new saqayya (Arabic public fountain) and entrance gate were built. In 1901 some new decorations and inscriptions were added to the wall in front of the tomb. In 1903, a place for ziyarat was built. In order to visit the zawiya (usually for a ziyarat), it is required to contact the members of Tijaniyya tariqa which will eventually be notified to the supervisor of the institution. Once the contact is made, visitors will meet the members in front of the zawiya and required to recite some verses to honor the Sheikh before entrance.

See also
 Lists of mosques
 List of mosques in Africa
 List of mosques in Morocco

References

Bibliography
Hillenbrand, Robert. 1994. Islamic Architecture. NY: Columbia UP, 240-251. 
Hoag, John. 1987. Islamic Architecture. NY: Rizzoli, 57-59.

Mosques in Fez, Morocco
18th-century establishments in Morocco
'Alawi architecture
18th-century architecture in Morocco